Diplostethus is a genus of click beetles in the family Elateridae. There are about six described species in Diplostethus, found in the Nearctic and the Neotropical Regions.

The species of Diplostethus range from 16 to 25 mm in length. They are similar to species of the genus Pittonotus.

Species
These six species belong to the genus Diplostethus:
 Diplostethus carolinensis (Schaeffer, 1916)  Southeastern United States
 Diplostethus meridianus (Champion, 1895)  Mexico
 Diplostethus opacicollis Schaeffer, 1916  Southwestern United States
 Diplostethus peninsularis (Champion, 1895)  Southwestern United States, Mexico
 Diplostethus setosus Germar, 1844  Mexico, Central America, South America
 Diplostethus texanus (Leconte, 1853)  Texas, Oklahoma, Arizona

References

External links

 

Elateridae